Anbar Salvation Council is a collection of tribal militias in the Al Anbar province of Iraq, formed by former Ba'athists and nationalists to fight al-Qaeda in Iraq and other associated terrorist groups. In Arabic the council is known as Sahawa Al Anbar (Arabic: صحوة الأنبار), abbreviated SAA when referred to by the US Army. The council has become a model for awakening movements across Iraq, though the Iraqi Defense Ministry has said that it plans to disband the Awakening groups due to concerns about their origins and future intent.

History
Shortly after the invasion in 2003, Sunni tribal leaders and former Ba'athists, led by members of the Al-Kharbit (Khalifa) and Al-Gaoud (Nimr) families met to select former Ba'ath General Karim Burjis as their unofficial leader and new Governor of Anbar Province. Burjis was later recognized by the coalition, and remained in office until 2004, when he was forced to resign by AQI as a condition to their release of kidnapped family members. This meeting 2003 was the first attempt by Sunni tribal and nationalist leaders to self-organize and re-establish order in Al Anbar. Many of those who participated in this initial meeting fled the country for the safety of the growing ex-pat community in Amman, Jordan to include the paramount sheikhs of the Khalifa and Alwani.

In 2005, tribal leaders again attempted to form a counter-AQI body, and organized the Anbar People's Committee.  This should not be confused with the Anbar Peoples Congress - a coalition of tribal leaders residing in Amman, Jordan.  The Anbar People's Committee was headed by the paramount sheikh of the Albu Fahad - Sheikh Walid Abd al Karim Mukhlif Fahadawi.  He was kidnapped from his home by AQI terrorists dressed as Iraqi Police and murdered.  After his murder, and the murder of several other APC leaders by AQI, the APC disbanded. This was the second official attempt at organizing an indigenous anit-AQI movement.

After the murder of Sheikh Walid Fahadawi, an anti-AQI vigilante group known as Thwar-al-Anbar (the Anbar Revolutionaries) was formed by individuals across Anbar to include Hameed al-Haiys Thiyabi, Muhammad al-Haiys Thiyabi, Jabar Fteykhan Rishawi, Aifan Sadoon Issawi, Jassim Muhammad Suwaydawi, as well as others from the Albu Fahad and Albu Bali tribes. The group's core members most likely never exceeded 30 members, yet had a disproportionately high impact in the fight against AQI, and the birth of the Awakening. TAA conducted their own murder and intimidation campaign in an attempt to out-terrorize the terrorists. Their operations resulting in the killing of numerous AQI emirs, and further reinforced the growing hostility toward AQI in Ramadi and Fallujah. TAA never officially disbanded, and those who survived their anti-AQI campaign served as the nucleus of what was to become the Awakening - Sahwah al-Anbar (SAA).

In August 2006, members of AQI operating in Al Ramadi, murdered a prominent member of the Albu Ali Jassim tribe, decapitated his dead body, and refused to allow the body to be returned per Muslim custom for burial within the traditional 3-day period. Following this incident, members of AQI next threatened to murder women affiliated with the Albu Ali Jassim in Ramadi. In response to the threat and murder of a prominent member, leaders within the Albu Ali Jassim, to include the murdered man's sons, sought assistance from other Anbar tribal leaders to include former members of TAA—Hameed al Haiys, Jassim Suwaydawi, and Jabar Rishawi—younger brother of Sheikh Abu Sattar Albu Risha. This is generally considered the beginning of SAA and the "Awakening." commonly considered the last straw and the spark that created the Al Anbar Salvation Council. To counter AQI, Sheikh Sattar, a former insurgent leader affiliated with the Numan Brigade in Ramadi, officially organized SAA—which included in its leadership Hameed al Haiys, Jassim Suwaydawi, Wissam Hardan Al Aithawi, Sheikh Ali Hatim al Sulayman, Abdullah Jallal al Faraji, Waleed Albu Ali Jassim, and Aifan Sadoon al Issawi. Sattar had himself been victimized by AQI—with his brother and father murdered.

While Wissam Hardan, Ali Hatem, and Aifan Sadoon all represented elite families within the tribes of Anbar, the majority of individuals within the SAA leadership were from families considered second and third-tier within their tribal hierarchy. This would create significant problems for coalition forces in Al Anbar who were faced with the decision of supporting the traditional tribal elite (most of which had fled to Amman, Jordan during the worst AQI violence) upon their return, or the "new" leadership represented by those affiliated with SAA.

In November 2006, a force of approximately 70 AQI fighters attacked the compound of Jassim Suwaydawi.  Aided by coalition forces, Jassim's small force of 17 family members held-off the attacking force, killing and wounding the vast majority. This is commonly referred to as the Battle of Sofia, and marks another turning point in the power of AQI over the tribes of Al Anbar.  As retribution for his defiance, Jassim's sister was abducted by members of AQI, and murdered by being dragged behind a vehicle. Her body was then decapitated, and head placed upon a pike in the middle of Sofia in an attempt to cause Jassim to come fight to retrieve it.

Over the next several months, Sattar encouraged members of the tribes affiliated with SAA to join the Iraqi Police. Elements of the Army Brigade stationed aboard traditional Albu Risha land now called Camp Ramadi, were instrumental in getting these recruits organized, trained, and equipped. In addition to their decision to support the Iraqi Police, tribal militias were organized across Anbar into what became known as PSFs (Provincial Security Forces), and were ultimately accepted by the Ministry of Interior. These forces later were attacked by the first chlorine gas suicide vehicle-born improvised explosive device (SVBIED) in late January, 2007, killing over 17 of their forces and demonstrating the threat Al Qaeda in Iraq considered these local security forces.

Fighting against the Americans in the earlier phases of the war, elements of this group have since allied themselves with the U.S. to rid their country of foreign extremist composing mainly of al-Qaeda in Iraq. It has been reported that they have received cars, guns, and ammunition by the Iraqi and U.S. forces to counter the radical Islamists in Al-Anbar province. In recent months elderly sheiks and tribal leaders have turned away from the Islamic State of Iraq, a radical Sunni extremist terrorist organization who specializes in car bombs and suicide attacks. On May 1, 2007 the Anbar Salvation Council announced that it had killed Abu Ayyub al-Masri, the war minister of the Islamic State of Iraq and the leader of al-Qaeda in Iraq. However, the U.S. military has refuted this claim and the status of al-Masri is still uncertain. While it is unknown if the Al Anbar Salvation council killed Abu Ayyub Al Masri, during the first few months of the council's existence, it is said that they killed more high level insurgents than US forces in the area.

Founding
Sheik Abdul Sattar Buzaigh al-Rishawi was a Sunni leader in the Al-Anbar province leading a growing movement of Sunni tribesmen who have turned against al-Qaida-linked insurgents. Al-Rishawi, whose father and three brothers were killed by al-Qaida assassins, said insurgents were "killing innocent people, anyone suspected of opposing them. They brought us nothing but destruction and we finally said, enough is enough."

Al-Rishawi founded the Anbar Salvation Council in September 2006 with dozens of Sunni tribes. Many of the new newly friendly leaders are believed to have at least tacitly supported the insurgency in the past, though al-Rishawi said he never did. His movement, also known as the Anbar Awakening, now counts 41 tribes or sub-tribes from Anbar, though al-Rishawi acknowledges that some groups in the province have yet to join. It's unclear how many that is, or much support the movement really has. On September 13, 2007, al-Rishawi was killed along with two of his bodyguards by a roadside bomb near his home in Ramadi, Anbar, Iraq.

Membership and organization
Sheikh Ahmed Abu Risha is the current head.

Assassinated members
Abdul Sattar Buzaigh al-Rishawi – former leader of the Anbar Salvation Council
Fasal al Gaood – former governor of al Anbar province

See also

2005 in Iraq
2006 in Iraq
2007 in Iraq
Al Qaeda in Iraq
Civil war in Iraq
Iraq War troop surge of 2007
Sons of Iraq

References

External links
'Anbar model' under fire The Christian Science Monitor

Indigenous counterinsurgency forces
Non-military counterterrorist organizations
Non-military counterinsurgency organizations
Iraq–United States relations
Military of Iraq
Occupation of Iraq
Politics of Iraq
War on terror